Mycena fuhreri is a species of agaric fungus in the family Mycenaceae. It is found in Tasmania, Australia, where it grows in leaf litter under Allocasuarina trees. Described in 2003 by mycologist Cheryl Grgurinovic, the specific epithet fuhreri honours mycologist Bruce A. Fuhrer.

References

External links

fuhreri
Fungi described in 2003
Fungi of Australia
Taxa named by Cheryl A. Grgurinovic